Tao Lin (born July 2, 1983) is an American novelist, poet, essayist, short-story writer, and artist. He has published four novels, a novella, two books of poetry, a collection of short stories, and a memoir, as well as an extensive assortment of online content. His third novel, Taipei, was published by Vintage on June 4, 2013. His nonfiction book Trip: Psychedelics, Alienation, and Change was published by Vintage on May 1, 2018. His fourth novel, Leave Society, was published by Vintage on August 3, 2021.

Life and education
Lin was born in Alexandria, Virginia, to Taiwanese parents and grew up in suburbs in and around Orlando, Florida. He attended Lake Howell High School, and graduated from New York University in 2005 with a B.A. in journalism. 
Lin moved to Hawaii in January 2020.

Career 
Lin quit his job after selling shares of the future royalties of his novel Richard Yates online in 2009. After Richard Yates, Lin got a literary agent, Bill Clegg, who sold his next book, Taipei, to Vintage Books, which has published his subsequent work. 
In 2008, Lin founded the independent press Muumuu House. The press has published four print books and over 100 stories, essays, and poems online, including work by Megan Boyle, Marie Calloway, Sheila Heti, and James Purdy.

In 2011, Lin and his ex-wife Megan Boyle founded MDMAfilms, a film production company, through which they released three experimental films, including Mumblecore. The films were made using a Macbook's iSight camera on an extremely low budget.

Lin has lectured on his writing, poetry, and art at Vassar College, Kansas City Art Institute, Columbia College, UNC Chapel Hill, and other universities and museums, including the Museum of Modern Art and the New Museum. In 2012 and in 2015 he taught a graduate course at Sarah Lawrence College called "The Contemporary Short Story."

In 2014, the website Jezebel posted screenshots of tweets by Lin's former girlfriend, writer E.R. Kennedy, alleging abuse, statutory rape, and plagiarism. The allegations stem from 2005, when Kennedy and Lin dated. At the time, Kennedy was 16 and Lin was 22. Lin responded on Facebook, denying the allegations. Kennedy deleted the tweets and asked Jezebel to take down the article, a request Jezebel ignored.

Lin began drawing what he called "mandalas" in 2014. Initially, he sold them on eBay. Mandala 12 was published on the cover of an issue of Vice Magazine. In an interview with Arachne, Lin said, "On February 12, 2014, I was absently drawing on graph paper. I drew what looked to me like a crop-circle idea. I drew over it, adding layers. When I was finished it looked like a mandala, and the paper I was using was square, like in mandalas, so I called it a mandala."

Critical response
Lin's writing has attracted negative and positive criticism from various publications. Gawker once called him "maybe perhaps the single most irritating person we've ever had to deal with", though he was later "pardoned". After reading this criticism, Lin retaliated by completely covering the front door of the Gawker office building with stickers bearing Britney Spears's name. Later, Gawker published a piece Lin had written. L Magazine wrote, "We've long been deeply irked by Lin's vacuous posturing and 'I know you are but what am I' dorm-room philosophizing". Sam Anderson wrote in New York Magazine, "Dismissing Lin, however, ignores the fact that he is deeply smart, funny, and head-over-heels dedicated in exactly the way we like our young artists to be." Miranda July has called Lin's work "moving and necessary."

The Atlantic described Lin as having a "fairly staggering" knack for self-promotion. The same article read, "there's something unusual about a writer being so transparent, so ready to tell you every insignificant detail of a seemingly eventful day, so aware of his next novel's word count, yet also remaining so opaque, mysterious, 'inscrutable.'" In n+1, critic Frank Guan called Lin "the first great male Asian author of American descent."

Lin's work has been praised in the UK, including positive reviews from The Guardian and the Times Literary Supplement, which called Lin "a daring, urgent voice for a malfunctioning age", and a 2010 career overview by the London Review of Books.

Since 2013, Lin's work has been associated with the mode of writing called "autofiction." Fellow autofictioners have praised his work. Ben Lerner said, "One thing I like about Tao’s writing is how beside the point for me ‘liking’ it feels—it's a frank depiction of the rhythm of a contemporary consciousness or lack of consciousness and so it has a power that bypasses those questions of taste entirely. Like it or not, it has the force of the real."

Books

you are a little bit happier than i am (2006)
In November 2006 Lin's first book, a poetry collection titled you are a little bit happier than i am, was published. It was the winner of Action Books' December Prize and has been a small-press bestseller.

Eeeee Eee Eeee & Bed (2007)
In May 2007 Lin's first novel, Eeeee Eee Eeee, and first story collection, Bed, were published simultaneously. Of the stories, Jennifer Bassett wrote in KGB Lit Journal, "In structure and tone, they have the feel of early Lorrie Moore and Deborah Eisenberg. Like Moore's characters, there are a lot of plays on language and within each story, a return to the same images or ideas—or jokes. And like Moore, most of these characters live in New York, are unemployed or recently employed, and are originally from somewhere more provincial (Florida in Lin's case, Wisconsin in Moore's). However, Lin knows to dig a little deeper into his characters—something we see in Moore's later stories, but less so in her early ones."

The books were ignored by most mainstream media but have since been referenced in The Independent (which called Eeeee Eee Eeee "a wonderfully deadpan joke") and The New York Times, which called Lin a "deadpan literary trickster" in reference to Eeeee Eee Eeee.

cognitive-behavioral therapy (2008)
In May 2008 Lin's second poetry collection, cognitive-behavioral therapy was published. The poem "room night" from this collection was anthologized in Wave Books' State of the Union. A French translation was published by Au Diable Vauvert in 2012.

Shoplifting from American Apparel (2009)
In September 2009 Lin's novella Shoplifting from American Apparel was published to mixed reviews. The Guardian wrote, "Trancelike and often hilarious… Lin's writing is reminiscent of early Douglas Coupland, or early Bret Easton Ellis, but there is also something going on here that is more profoundly peculiar, even Beckettian." The Village Voice called it a "fragile, elusive book". Bookslut wrote, "it shares an affected childishness with bands like The Moldy Peaches and it has a put-on weirdness reminiscent of Miranda July's No One Belongs Here More Than You." Time Out New York wrote, "Writing about being an artist makes most contemporary artists self-conscious, squeamish and arch. Lin, however, appears to be comfortable, even earnest, when his characters try to describe their aspirations (or their shortcomings) [...] purposefully raw." The San Francisco Chronicle wrote, "Tao Lin's sly, forlorn, deadpan humor jumps off the page [...] will delight fans of everyone from Mark Twain to Michelle Tea." The Los Angeles Times wrote, "Camus' The Stranger or sociopath?"; the Austin Chronicle called it "scathingly funny" and wrote that "it might just be the future of literature." Another reviewer described it as "a vehicle...for self-promotion."

In a December 2009 episode of KCRW's Bookworm, Michael Silverblatt called the novella "the purest example so far of the minimalist aesthetic as it used to be enunciated" and Lin described the novella's style as deliberately "concrete, with all the focus on surface details, with no sentences devoted to thoughts or feelings, and I think that results in a kind of themelessness, that, in its lack of focus on anything else, the theme becomes, to me, the passage of time." In the same month, clothing retailer Urban Outfitters began selling Shoplifting from American Apparel in its stores.

Richard Yates (2010)
Lin's second novel, Richard Yates, was published on September 7, 2010, by Melville House,.

In The New York Times Book Review, Charles Bock called the book "more interesting as a concept than as an actual narrative", adding, Richard Yates channels the author's obvious creative abilities into an exploration of illicit love and obsession. Haley Joel Osment, 22, a writer living in New York, is flirting with Dakota Fanning, a troubled 16-year-old girl in New Jersey. (As their communications begin online, the celebrity monikers are presumably screen names.) The novel begins: "‘I’ve only had the opportunity to hold a hamster once,’ said Dakota Fanning on Gmail chat. ‘Its paws were so tiny. I think I cried a little.’" This opening will charm the innocent hearts of some readers; those less amused might find it cloying and gimmicky..." Bock wrote that "during important scenes, Lin slows time and piles sentences into longer paragraphs, replicating complex thought processes and shifting, nuanced moods, while showing his admiration for the work of Lydia Davis." The review ended, "By the time I reached the last 50 pages, each time the characters said they wanted to kill themselves, I knew exactly how they felt."

Writing in The Boston Globe, Danielle Dreilinger wrote, "By all rights, this sixth book by Tao Lin ought to be dreadful. It has an unnecessary index, protagonists named after child stars, and a title that pays homage to a famous novelist who has no concrete connection with the book ... But Richard Yates is neither pretentious nor sneering nor reflexively hip. It is simply a focused, moving, and rather upsetting portrait of two oddballs in love ... These characters have lives of their own. At first, the relationship is magical. They steal vegan sushi from Whole Foods, watch art films, and spend hours on Gmail chat ... As time passes, the relationship starts to slip its traces. Lin is brilliant at capturing the moments in a relationship where everything turns bad at once ... Though Osment means to help, not hurt, his narcissism is devastating: Laboring under his self-improvement regime, Fanning becomes more and more self-destructive.

Taipei (2013)
On February 23, 2013, Publishers Weekly awarded Taipei a starred review, predicting it would be Lin's "breakout" book and calling it "a novel about disaffection that's oddly affecting" and "a book without an ounce of self-pity, melodrama, or posturing." The same month, Bret Easton Ellis tweeted, "With Taipei Tao Lin becomes the most interesting prose stylist of his generation, which doesn't mean that Taipei isn't a boring novel".

Taipei was published by Vintage on June 4, 2013, to mostly positive reviews. Novelist Benjamin Lytal, writing in the New York Observer, called it Lin's "modernist masterpiece", adding, "[W]e should stop calling Tao Lin the voice of his generation. Taipei, his new novel, has less to do with his generation than with the literary tradition of Knut Hamsun, Ernest Hemingway, and Robert Musil." According to Slate, "Taipei casts a surprisingly introspective eye on the spare, 21st-century landscape Lin has such a knack for depicting".

New York Times critic Dwight Garner wrote, "I loathe reviews in which a critic claims to have love-hate feelings about a work of art. It's a way of having no opinion at all. But I love and hate Taipei".

On June 18, critic Emily Witt wrote in The Daily Beast:

Taipei is exactly the kind of book I hoped Tao Lin would one day write. He is one of the few fiction writers around who engages with contemporary life, rather than treating his writing online as existing in opposition to or apart from the hallowed analog space of the novel. He's consistently good for a few laughs and writes in a singular style already much imitated by his many sycophants on the Internet. Some people like Tao Lin for solely these reasons, or treat him as a sort of novelty or joke. But Lin can also produce the feelings of existential wonder that all good novelists provoke. His writing reveals the hyperbole in conversational language that we use, it seems, to make up for living lives where equanimity and well-adjustment are the most valued attributes, where human emotions are pathologized into illness: we do not fall in love, we become "obsessed"; we do not dislike, we "hate". We manipulate ourselves chemically to avoid acting "crazy."

On June 30, in The New York Times Book Review, Clancy Martin wrote:

His writing is weird, upsetting, memorable, honest—and it's only getting better [...] But I didn't anticipate Taipei, his latest, which is, to put it bluntly, a gigantic leap forward. Here we have a serious, first-rate novelist putting all his skills to work. Taipei is a love story, and although it's Lin's third novel it's also, in a sense, a classic first novel: it's semi-autobiographical (Lin has described it as the distillation of 25,000 pages of memory) and it's a bildungsroman, a coming-of-age story about a young man who learns, through love, that life is larger than he thought it was.

Other reviews of the novel were mixed.

On July 5 The New York Times Book Review awarded Taipei an Editors' Choice distinction. It was the only paperback on the list for the week.

On KCRW's "Bookworm", in a conversation with Lin, Michael Silverblatt called it "The most moving depiction of the way we live now," calling it "unbearably moving."

Taipei was included on best book of the year lists by the Times Literary Supplement, Village Voice, Slate, Salon, Bookforum, The Week, Maisonneuve, and Complex, among others.

High Resolution, a film adaptation of Taipei, was released in 2018.

Selected Tweets (2015)

On June 15, 2015, Short Flight/Long Drive Books published a collaborative double-book called Selected Tweets by Lin and poet Mira Gonzalez. The book features selections from eight years of their tweets at nine different Twitter accounts, as well as visual art by each author, footnotes, and "Extras". Emma Kolchin-Miller, writing in the Columbia Spectator, described the book as featuring "a selection of bleak, depressed, disturbing, funny, and personal tweets that create a fragmented narrative and show how Twitter can serve as a platform for art, storytelling, and connection." Andrea Longini, writing for Electric Literature, opined: "Although Twitter in name implies a kind of chatter or 'twittering,' Tao Lin and Mira Gonzalez have elevated the medium into an art form with the power to transmit authentic observations."

Trip (2018)
In May 2018, Lin's Trip: Psychedelics, Alienation, and Change, a nonfiction account of his experiences with psychedelic drugs, was published by Vintage Books. Much of the book is devoted to Lin's continuing fascination with the life and thought of Terence McKenna, as well as an introduction to McKenna's ex-wife Kathleen Harrison.

Trip was a Los Angeles Times bestseller. In Scientific American, John Horgan wrote, "If an aspirant asks for an example of experimental science writing, I’ll recommend Trip. The book veers from excruciatingly candid autobiography to biography (of McKenna) to investigative journalism…to interview-based journalism to philosophical speculation to first-person accounts of the effects of DMT and Salvia." Of Trip, Sheila Heti wrote, "This book has changed how I understand myself on a cellular level. It’s a superbly researched, moving, and formally inventive quest for re-enchantment, and Tao Lin’s most compelling and profound book yet."

Leave Society (2021)
Lin's fourth novel, Leave Society, was published on August 3, 2021. In a review published online on the book's release date and later in the print edition of The New York Times Book Review, Christine Smallwood wrote of the book's main character, "Li has left behind speed, despair and his belief in Western medicine. (He refuses steroid shots for his back pain.) But what he is really recovering from is existentialism, the idea that life has no meaning other than what we give it. He now believes that the world has an inherent purpose ... Stylistically, the book is artful, even radical ... Despite, or perhaps because of, its virtues, the novel doesn’t hold the reader in its thrall. It meanders, linking scenes of low-key bickering in a gentle ebb and flow of harmony and disharmony. It doesn’t seem to mind if you put it down ... But the novel has a vision, however cracked, an idea connected to its form, which is more than I can say for most books."

In a review in The New Yorker, Andrea Long Chu wrote:The first sentence of almost every chapter contains at least one number, often several, like a medical record: "Thirty tabs of LSD arrived on day thirty-five." This kind of prose can be elegant; it can also feel like dieting ... But it’s most interesting to consider the book’s flat affect as a curious, sidewise effect of Li’s linguistic relationship to his parents ... There is a translated quality to this kind of writing, as if Lin were rendering Mandarin word for word; in fact, given Li’s propensity for audio recordings, this is likely exactly what happened ... the effect he’s created is a kind of fastidious plotlessness, one whose accuracy to life, affected or not, has the ambivalent virtue of being, like life itself, mostly boring.

In the Los Angeles Review of Books, Lamorna Ash wrote: Lin introduces a radical shift in outlook, a change from a posture of boredom to one of awe [...] The final sentence of Leave Society—"Li took a leaf"—echoes an earlier scene in which Li offers a leaf to his brother’s son. "What is it?" his nephew asks. "A leaf," Li tells him. "It’s just a tiny leaf." Literally, just a leaf, something that provokes awe by being nothing more than what it is. On my first reading of Leave Society, I did not know what, if anything, to make of the homophone "leaf" and "leave." On the second reading, when I was better accustomed to Lin’s humor and his delight in multiplicity, it seemed to me both metaphorical and literal, playful and quite serious, a brilliant, almost perfect ending.Leave Society also received pre-publication reviews in Kirkus Reviews and Publishers Weekly.

Bibliography

Poetry
 this emotion was a little e-book, (bear parade, 2006)
 you are a little bit happier than i am, (Action Books, 2006)
 cognitive-behavioral therapy, (Melville House, 2008)

Novels
 Eeeee Eee Eeee (Melville House, 2007)
 Richard Yates (Melville House, 2010)
 Taipei (Vintage Books, 2013)
 Leave Society (Vintage Books, 2021)

Novellas
 Shoplifting from American Apparel (Melville House, 2009)

Stories
 Today The Sky is Blue and White with Bright Blue Spots and a Small Pale Moon and I Will Destroy Our Relationship Today, (bear parade, 2006)
 Bed (Melville House, 2007)

Nonfiction
 Selected Tweets (Short Flight/Long Drive Books, 2015)
 Trip: Psychedelics, Alienation, and Change (Vintage Books, 2018)

References

External links
 Lin's website

21st-century American novelists
American male novelists
American writers of Taiwanese descent
21st-century American poets
American short story writers
American writers of Chinese descent
Living people
Writers from Brooklyn
New York University alumni
Sarah Lawrence College faculty
Novelists from Florida
American male short story writers
American male poets
Writers from Alexandria, Virginia
Novelists from Virginia
Novelists from New York (state)
1983 births